Ignatius Longjan (19 May 1944 – 10 February 2020) was a Nigerian diplomat and politician who also served as a Senator representing the Plateau Southern district in the 9th National Assembly. He also previously served as the deputy Governor of Plateau State.

Early life and education 
Ignatius Longjan was born in Kwa, Quanpaan Local government area of present day Plateau State, Nigeria. He attended the Kwa Junior/Senior Primary School and St. Joseph's College, Vom. He then attended the Ahmadu Bello University Zaria for his University education, where he obtained a Diploma in Law and also attended the City University of New York where he obtained a bachelor's degree in Public Administration.

Diplomatic career 
Most of his working life was spent in the Nigerian foreign service where he served in Nigerian missions abroad including Hamburg, Germany, The Hague, Holland, Conakry, Guinea, New York, USA and Moscow, Russia.

Political career
Ignatius Longjan was the Chief of Staff to the Plateau State Governor between 2007 and 2011. He subsequently became the Deputy Governor of Plateau State between 2011 and 2015. In 2019 he contested to represent the Plateau Southern Senatorial at the Nigerian National Assembly. At his party's primary selection, he scored 972 votes to beat the other contestants for the party's ticket.
In the 25 February 2019, general election, he polled 140,918 votes to win the election.

Death
On 10 February 2020, Ignatius Longjan died at a hospital in Abuja, Nigeria.

References

1944 births
2020 deaths
Members of the Senate (Nigeria)
All Progressives Congress politicians
People from Plateau State